Aurora, also known as the Pink House, Boxwood, and the Penn Homestead, is a historic home located at Penn's Store near Spencer, Patrick County, Virginia. It was built between 1853 and 1856, and is a two-story, three-bay, hipped-roof frame house in the Italian Villa style.  It features one-story porches on the east and west facades, round-arched windows, clustered chimneys, and low pitched roofs.  Also on the property is a contributing small one-story frame building once used as an office.  It was built by Thomas Jefferson Penn (1810-1888), whose son, Frank Reid Penn founded the company F.R & G. Penn Co. that was eventually acquired by tobacco magnate James Duke to form the American Tobacco Company.

It was listed on the National Register of Historic Places in 2009.

References

Houses on the National Register of Historic Places in Virginia
Italianate architecture in Virginia
Houses completed in 1856
Houses in Patrick County, Virginia
National Register of Historic Places in Patrick County, Virginia